In geometry, a limaçon trisectrix is the name for the  quartic plane curve that is a trisectrix that is specified as a limaçon.  The shape of the limaçon trisectrix can be specified by other curves particularly as a rose, conchoid or epitrochoid. The curve is one among a number of plane curve trisectrixes that includes the Conchoid of Nicomedes, the Cycloid of Ceva, Quadratrix of Hippias, Trisectrix of Maclaurin, and Tschirnhausen cubic. The limaçon trisectrix a special case of a sectrix of Maclaurin.

Specification and loop structure 
The limaçon trisectrix specified as a polar equation is
.
The constant  may be positive or negative.

The limaçon trisectrix is composed of two loops.
 The outer loop is defined when  on the polar angle interval , and is symmetric about the polar axis.  The point furthest from the pole on the outer loop has the coordinates .
 The inner loop is defined when  on the polar angle interval , and is symmetric about the polar axis.  The point furthest from the pole on the inner loop has the coordinates , and on the polar axis, is one-third of the distance from the pole compared to the furthest point of the outer loop.
 The outer and inner loops intersect at the pole.

The curve can be specified in Cartesian coordinates as
,

and parametric equations

,
.

Relationship with rose curves 
As a rose, the curve has the structure of a single petal with two loops that is inscribed in the circle  and is symmetric about the polar axis.

The inverse of this rose is a trisectrix since the inverse has the same shape as the trisectrix of Maclaurin.

Relationship with the sectrix of Maclaurin 
See the article Sectrix of Maclaurin on the limaçon as an instance of the sectrix.

Trisection properties 
The outer and inner loops of the limaçon trisectrix have angle trisection properties.  Theoretically, an angle may be trisected using a method with either property, though practical considerations may limit use.

Outer loop trisectrix property 

The construction of the outer loop of  reveals its angle trisection properties. The outer loop exists on the interval .  Here, we examine the trisectrix property of the portion of the outer loop above the polar axis, i.e., defined on the interval .

 First, note that polar equation  is a circle with radius , center  on the polar axis, and has a diameter that is tangent to the line  at the pole .

 Second, consider any chord  of the circle with the polar angle .  Since  is a right triangle, .  The corresponding point  on the outer loop has coordinates , where .

Given this construction, it is shown that  and two other angles trisect  as follows:

 The base angles of isosceles triangle  measure  – specifically, .

Consequently the base angles,  and  measure .

 . Thus  is trisected, since .

The upper half of the outer loop can trisect any central angle of  because  implies  which is in the domain of the outer loop.

Inner loop trisectrix property 

The inner loop of the limaçon trisectrix has the desirable property that the trisection of an angle is internal to the angle being trisected. Here, we examine the inner loop of  that lies above the polar axis, which is defined on the polar angle interval .

(Note: atan2(y,x) gives the polar angle of the Cartesian coordinate point (x,y).)

With respect to the limaçon, the range of polar angles  that defines the inner loop is problematic because the range of polar angles subject to trisection falls in the range . Furthermore, on its native domain, the radial coordinates of the inner loop are non-positive.

.

The second solution is based on the identity  which is expressed as
, which implies ,
and shows that  demonstrating the larger angle has been trisected.

The upper half of the inner loop can trisect any central angle of  because  implies  which is in the domain of the re-defined loop.

Line segment trisection property 
The limaçon trisectrix  trisects the line segment on the polar axis that serves as its axis of symmetry.

Relationship with the trisectrix hyperbola 

Given the limaçon trisectrix , the inverse  is the polar equation of a hyperbola with eccentricity equal to 2, a curve that is a trisectrix. (See Hyperbola - angle trisection.)

References

External Links 

"The Trisection Problem" by Robert C. Yates published in 1942 and reprinted by the National Council of Teachers of Mathematics available at the U.S. Dept. of Education ERIC site.

 "Trisecting an Angle with a Limaçon" animation of the outer loop angle trisection property produced by the Wolfram Demonstration Project.
"Limaçon" at 2dcurves.com
"Trisectrix" at A Visual Dictionary of Special Plane Curves
"Limaçon Trisecteur" at Encyclopédie des Formes Mathématiques Remarquables

Plane curves
Algebraic curves